Basic Miles: The Classic Performances of Miles Davis is a compilation album by American jazz musician Miles Davis, released in 1973 by Columbia Records and recorded from 1955 through 1962.

Track listing 
"Budo" – 4:16
"Stella By Starlight" – 4:50
"Sweet Sue, Just You" – 3:40
"Little Melonae" – 7:21
"Miles Ahead" – 3:35
"On Green Dolphin Street" – 9:48
"'Round Midnight" – 5:54
"Fran-Dance (Put Your Little Foot Right Out)" – 7:09
"Devil May Care" – 3:26

Personnel

George Avakian – producer
Miles Davis – composer, trumpeter, flugelhornist
Bronislaw Kaper – composer
Teo Macero – producer
Jackie McLean – composer
Bud Powell – composer
Victor Young – composer
Russ Payne – mixer
Cannonball Adderley – alto saxophonist
Lee Konitz – alto saxophonist
Danny Bank – bass clarinetist
William Corea – bongo player
Paul Chambers – bassist
Romeo Penque – clarinetist, flute player
Sid Cooper – clarinetist, flute player
Jimmy Buffington – French hornist
Tony Miranda – French hornist
Willie Ruff – French hornist

Red Garland – pianist
Bill Evans – pianist
Wynton Kelly – pianist
Philly Joe Jones – drummer
Jimmy Cobb – drummer
Art Taylor – drummer
Bernie Glow – tenor saxophonist
Wayne Shorter – tenor saxophonist
Frank Rehak – trombonist
Jimmy Cleveland – trombonist
Joe Bennett – trombonist
Tom Mitchell – trombonist
Ernie Royal – trumpeter
John Carisi – trumpeter
Louis Mucci – trumpeter
Taft Jordan – trumpeter
Bill Barber – tubist

Charting and reviews

Reviews

Charting history

References

External links

1973 greatest hits albums
Albums produced by George Avakian
Albums produced by Teo Macero
Miles Davis compilation albums
Columbia Records compilation albums
Albums recorded at CBS 30th Street Studio